The 2021 Federated Auto Parts 400 Salute to First Responders was a NASCAR Cup Series race held on September 11, 2021 at Richmond Raceway in Richmond, Virginia. Contested over 400 laps on the  D-shaped short track, it was the 28th race of the 2021 NASCAR Cup Series season, second race of the Playoffs and second race of the Round of 16.

Martin Truex Jr. overcame an early drive-through penalty for jumping the start to win the race. Kyle Larson's sixth place ensured he would join Truex and Denny Hamlin in the round of 12.

Report

Background

Richmond Raceway (RR), formerly known as Richmond International Raceway (RIR), is a 3/4-mile (1.2 km), D-shaped, asphalt race track located just outside Richmond, Virginia in Henrico County. It hosts the NASCAR Cup Series, the NASCAR Xfinity Series, NASCAR Camping World Truck Series and the IndyCar series. Known as "America's premier short track", it formerly hosted two USAC sprint car races.

Entry list
 (R) denotes rookie driver.
 (i) denotes driver who are ineligible for series driver points.

Qualifying
Kyle Larson was awarded the pole for the race as determined by competition-based formula.

Starting Lineup

Race

Kyle Larson was awarded the pole for the race, but dropped to the rear at the start. At the start of the race, Martin Truex Jr. was penalized for crossing the start/finish line ahead of leader Denny Hamlin. Early in the race, Kurt Busch cut a tire and slammed the wall. Hamlin won both stages and led the most laps in the race. Kyle Busch was leading late in the race but was penalized for speeding on pit road during a round of green-flag pit stops. Truex Jr. gained the lead and went on to win the race, advancing to the next round of the playoffs. Larson also advanced to the next round of the playoffs on points.

Stage Results

Stage One
Laps: 80

Stage Two
Laps: 155

Final Stage Results

Stage Three
Laps: 165

Race statistics
 Lead changes: 21 among 8 different drivers
 Cautions/Laps: 5 for 30
 Red flags: 0
 Time of race: 3 hours, 3 minutes and 6 seconds
 Average speed:

Media

Television
NBC Sports covered the race on the television side. Rick Allen, Jeff Burton, Steve Letarte and three-time Richmond winner Dale Earnhardt Jr. called the race from the broadcast booth. Parker Kligerman, Marty Snider and Dillon Welch handled the pit road duties from pit lane.

Radio
The Motor Racing Network had the radio call for the race, which was also simulcast on Sirius XM NASCAR Radio. Alex Hayden, Jeff Striegle and Rusty Wallace called the race from the broadcast booth for MRN when the field races through the front straightaway. Dave Moody called the race from a platform when the field races down the backstraightaway. Steve Post and Kim Coon called the action for MRN from pit lane.

Standings after the race

Drivers' Championship standings

Manufacturers' Championship standings

Note: Only the first 16 positions are included for the driver standings.

References

2021 in sports in Virginia
2021 NASCAR Cup Series
2021
September 2021 sports events in the United States
2021 in Richmond, Virginia